Admiral Sir Robert Hastings Penruddock Harris KCB, KCMG (12 October 1843 – 25 August 1926) was a Royal Navy officer who went on to be Commander-in-Chief, Cape of Good Hope Station.

Naval career
Harris joined the Royal Navy in 1856. Promoted to captain in 1879 and to rear-admiral in 1891, he commanded the Training Squadron from 1893 to 1895 before becoming Second-in-Command of the Mediterranean Fleet in 1896. In that role he was involved in the Cretan Revolt.

He was appointed Commander-in-Chief, Cape of Good Hope Station in 1898 and played an important role in the Second Boer War: in October 1899 he formed a Naval Brigade and despatched the brigade to support General Frederick Forestier-Walker in defeating of the Boers at the Battle of Ladysmith – one of the guns surrendered by the Boers survives at Devonport today. Promoted to vice admiral in 1901 he went on to serve as President of the Royal Naval College, Greenwich in 1903 with promotion to admiral in 1904.

He lived at a house called The Brake in Yelverton, Devon.

Family
He married Florence Cordelia Henn-Gennys; they had three sons and five daughters.

References

External links
 

|-

1843 births
1926 deaths
Admiral presidents of the Royal Naval College, Greenwich
Royal Navy admirals
Knights Commander of the Order of the Bath
Knights Commander of the Order of St Michael and St George